Provincial Highway 63 is a limited-access highway, which begins in Taichung at the intersection of Guoguang Road (Provincial Highway No. 3) and Zhongming South Road and ends in Caotun, Nantou on Bixing Road (Provincial Road 14B). It is commonly known as Zhongtou (Taichung-Nantou) Highway.

Length
The total length of the highway is 19.023 km. However, the viaduct actually begins at 1.8 km (on Wuquan South Road).

Exit list
{| class="plainrowheaders wikitable"
|-
!scope=col|City
!scope=col|Location
!scope=col|km
!scope=col|Mile
!scope=col|Exit
!scope=col|Name
!scope=col|Destinations
!scope=col|Notes
|-

|colspan=8 style="text-align:center;" |Begin Viaduct

|colspan=8 style="text-align:center;" |End Viaduct

Major Cities Along the Route
Taichung
Caotun, Nantou

Intersections with other Freeways and Expressways
None.  However, it crosses National Highway No. 3 near Zhongtou IC. in Wufeng, Taichung.  To access National Highway No. 3, one must navigate surface streets for two or three minutes to get onto a northbound or southbound ramp for the highway.

Spurs
There is a spur (No. 63A) connecting to Bo-ai Road (Provincial Highway No. 14) in downtown Caotun, Nantou. The length of the spur is 2.193 km.

See also
 Highway system in Taiwan

Notes
Completed on January 1, 1998.

This highway is no longer classified as an expressway on July 1, 2006.  Despite this lack of designation, it still functions as one.

References

http://www.thb.gov.tw/

Highways in Taiwan